Alice Weiwers was a tennis player from Luxembourg. Weiwers was the winner of Tournoi de France, the French Championship tournament held in Vichy France. Weiwers won the 1941 and 1942 singles, 1941 doubles, and 1941 mixed doubles titles.

References

See also
List of French Open women's singles champions

Luxembourgian female tennis players
Possibly living people
Year of birth missing (living people)